I-39 was an Imperial Japanese Navy B1 type submarine. Completed and commissioned in 1943, she served in World War II, operating in support of Japanese forces in the Battle of Tarawa before she was sunk in November 1943.

Construction and commissioning

I-39 was laid down on 19 June 1941 by at the Sasebo Navy Yard at Sasebo, Japan, with the name Submarine No. 152. Renamed I-39 by the time she was launched on 15 April 1942 and provisionally attached to the Yokosuka Naval District that day, she was completed and commissioned on 22 April 1943.

Service history
Upon commissioning, I-39 was attached formally to the Yokosuka Naval District and assigned to Submarine Squadron 11 for work-ups. With those completed, she was reassigned to Submarine Division 14 in Submarine Squadron 8 in the Submarine Advance Force on 20 July 1943. She departed Yokosuka on 21 July 1943 and arrived at Truk on 27 July 1943.

First war patrol
On 2 August 1943, I-39 set out from Truk on her first war patrol, with a patrol area in the New Hebrides. She was depth-charged briefly by a destroyer north of Espiritu Santo on 7 August 1943, and on 29 August 1943 two destroyers sighted and pursued her, but she suffered no damage in either encounter.

On 2 September 1943, I-39 sighted a convoy of three transports escorted by four destroyers.  She fired two torpedoes, both of which exploded close astern of the attack transport , which was carrying the New Zealand Army′s 3rd Division from Port Vila on Efate to Point Cruz on Guadalcanal.  A destroyer attempted a counterattack, but failed to locate I-39.  On 10 September, I-39 sighted an unescorted transport heading toward Espiritu Santo at 09:50, but could not get within torpedo range of her.  On 11 September I-39 sighted another unescorted transport east of Espiritu Santo at 05:05 and two transports escorted by a destroyer at 18:10, but made no attacks.

Mistaking Navajo for a British  light cruiser, she hit Navajo with a single torpedo amidships on her starboard side.

While returning to Truk, I-39 suffered damage when she was depth-charged on 25 September 1943.  She reached Truk on 27 September 1943 and underwent repairs there.

Second war patrol
The Gilbert and Marshall Islands campaign began on 20 November 1943 with the U.S. invasion of Tarawa and of Makin in the Gilbert Islands. With a Yokosuka E14Y1 (Allied reporting name "Glen") floatplane aboard, she got underway from Truk on her second war patrol that day, with an assigned patrol area southwest of Tarawa. She reported on 24 November 1943 that she was approaching her patrol area, and on 25 November — the same day she was reassigned to Submarine Division 2 in Submarine Squadron 1 — she reported that she had arrived in her patrol area. The Japanese never heard from her again.

Loss

At 23:02 the destroyer  was detached to investigate. She detected a surfaced submarine on radar at 23:20 and closed with it. She lost radar contact, apparently when the submarine submerged, but Boyd then located the submarine with her sonar. On the morning of 27 November 1943, planes from the aircraft carrier  flew over the area and reported a large oil slick on the surface. It marked the end of a Japanese submarine.

The submarine probably was I-39, although it is possible that Boyd sank , which also disappeared in the Tarawa area around the same time. An alternative account claims that the destroyer escort  sank I-39 off Koli Point, Guadalcanal, on 23 December 1943, although that location lies outside I-39′s patrol area and the date is four weeks after she last transmitted a message,

On 20 February 1944, the Imperial Japanese Navy declared I-39 to be presumed lost with her entire crew of 96 in the Gilbert Islands area. She was stricken from the Navy list on 30 April 1944.

Notes

Bibliography
 Hackett, Bob & Kingsepp, Sander.  IJN Submarine I-39: Tabular Record of Movement.  Retrieved on August 26, 2020.

External links
 Photo of launch of I-39 on Japanese Wikipedia

Type B1 submarines
Ships built by Sasebo Naval Arsenal
1942 ships
World War II submarines of Japan
Japanese submarines lost during World War II
Ships lost with all hands
Submarines sunk by United States warships
Maritime incidents in November 1943
World War II shipwrecks in the Pacific Ocean